Eduardo Elixbet Acosta (born March 9, 1944) is a former Major League Baseball pitcher who played for three seasons. He was signed by the Houston Astros before the 1967 season and played for the Pittsburgh Pirates in 1970 and the San Diego Padres from 1971 to 1972.

See also
List of Major League Baseball players from Panama

External links

Baseball Gauge
Venezuelan Professional Baseball League

1944 births
Living people
Águilas del Zulia players
Algodoneros de Unión Laguna players
Cardenales de Villahermosa players
Charleston Charlies players
Cocoa Astros players
Columbus Jets players
Hawaii Islanders players
Leones del Caracas players
Panamanian expatriate baseball players in Venezuela
Major League Baseball pitchers
Major League Baseball players from Panama
Mexican League baseball pitchers
Panamanian expatriate baseball players in Mexico
Panamanian expatriate baseball players in the United States
People from Boquete District
Pittsburgh Pirates players
San Diego Padres players
Tecolotes de Nuevo Laredo players
Waterbury Pirates players